The 2016 Brasil Tennis Cup was a women's tennis tournament played on outdoor hard courts. It was the 4th edition of the Brasil Tennis Cup, a WTA International tournaments of the 2016 WTA Tour. It took place in Florianópolis, Brazil from July 31 to August 5, 2016.

Points and prize money

Point distribution

Prize money

Singles main draw entrants

Seeds 

 Rankings are as of July 25, 2016.

Other entrants 
The following players received wildcards into the singles main draw:
  Maria Fernanda Alves
  Beatriz Haddad Maia
  Jelena Janković

The following players received entry from the qualifying draw:
  Montserrat González
  Réka Luca Jani
  Nadiia Kichenok
  Nadia Podoroska
  Valeriya Solovyeva
  Renata Zarazúa

The following players received entry as lucky losers:
  Martina Capurro Taborda
  Lyudmyla Kichenok
  Laura Pigossi
  Emily Webley-Smith

Withdrawals 
Before the tournament
  Annika Beck → replaced by  Alizé Lim
  Mariana Duque Mariño → replaced by  Lyudmyla Kichenok
  Caroline Garcia → replaced by  Aleksandrina Naydenova
  Hsieh Su-wei → replaced by  Verónica Cepede Royg
  Kristína Kučová  → replaced by  Laura Pigossi
  Tatjana Maria → replaced by  Paula Cristina Gonçalves
  Monica Niculescu → replaced by  Gabriela Cé
  Tamira Paszek → replaced by  Olga Savchuk
  Kristýna Plíšková → replaced by  Anastasia Pivovarova
  Yulia Putintseva → replaced by  Emily Webley-Smith
  Maria Sakkari → replaced by  Laura Pous Tió
  Anastasija Sevastova → replaced by  Ana Bogdan
  Laura Siegemund → replaced by  Martina Capurro Taborda
  Lesia Tsurenko → replaced by  Catalina Pella

Doubles main draw entrants

Seeds 

 Rankings are as of July 25, 2016.

Other entrants 
The following pair received a wildcard into the doubles main draw:
  Carolina Meligeni Alves /  Luisa Stefani

Champions

Singles 

  Irina-Camelia Begu def.  Tímea Babos, 2–6, 6–4, 6–3

Doubles 

  Lyudmyla Kichenok /  Nadiia Kichenok def.  Tímea Babos /  Réka Luca Jani, 6–3, 6–1

External links 
 Official website

Brasil Tennis Cup
Brasil Tennis Cup
2016 in Brazilian tennis